Francis George Sinclair (24 August 1916 – 7 February 1986) was an  Australian rules footballer who played with South Melbourne in the Victorian Football League (VFL).

Notes

External links 

1916 births
1986 deaths
Australian rules footballers from Melbourne
Sydney Swans players
People from Carlton, Victoria